Clinton was a proposed Rochester Industrial and Rapid Transit Railway station located in Rochester, New York. The station would have been located between Court Street and Meigs-Goodman stations, near the South Avenue Loop and the connection to the Lehigh Valley Railroad Station, close to the downtown central business district.

Plans for a wood and steel station were drawn up during the early 1940s and approved by City Council in June 1943, but turned down by the War Production Board. A revised design for a concrete structure costing $101,000 was then approved, but wartime shortages prevented its construction.

References

Railway stations in Rochester, New York